Bethel, Ynysybwl was a Calvinistic Methodist chapel in Rock Terrace, Ynysybwl, Glamorgan, Wales.

Early history
The church at Bethel dated from the late 18th century, although the older buildings were converted into dwellings in 1876 when the new chapel was built. It is claimed that Howel Harris preached in the area before the original cause was established. John Wesley is claimed to have preached at Bethel in 1786.

During the late 19th century, Bethel, like so many nonconformist chapels, played a wider role in the life of the community than in a purely religious sphere. Public lectures were very popular, such as that delivered by the renowned poet-preacher Evan Rees (Dyfed) in 1899 on "The Land of the Negros", a popular theme at the height of British colonial activity. The lecture was apparently appreciated by a full house.

Twentieth century
The chapel remained open into the late 20th century, but closed in the 1970s. The building was converted for domestic use in 1978.

References

Bibliography

External links
Coflein database entry

Chapels in Rhondda Cynon Taf